Povilas is a Lithuanian masculine given name and may refer to:

Povilas Aksomaitis (1938–2004), Lithuanian engineer, politician, and signatory of the 1990 Act of the Re-Establishment of the State of Lithuania
Povilas Budrys (born 1962), Lithuanian painter
Povilas Bartušis (born 1993), Lithuanian male badminton player
Povilas Butkevičius (born 1987), Lithuanian former basketball player
Povilas Jakubėnas (1871–1953) Lithuanian Calvinist clergyman, general superintendent of the Lithuanian branch of the Reformed Church
Povilas Leimonas (born 1987), Lithuanian footballer
Povilas Lukšys (footballer) (born 1979), Lithuanian footballer
Povilas Meškėla (born 1964), Lithuanian rock singer and musician (Rojaus tūzai and Katedra)
Povilas Mykolaitis (born 1983), Lithuanian long jumper
Povilas Plechavičius (1890–1973), Imperial Russian and then Lithuanian military officer and statesman
Povilas Stravinsky, Lithuanian pianist active in the United States
Povilas Stulga Museum of Lithuanian Folk Instruments, located in Kaunas, Lithuania
Povilas Tautvaišas (1916–1980), Lithuanian-American chess master
Povilas Vaitonis (1911–1983), Lithuanian–Canadian International Master of chess
Povilas Vanagas (born 1970), Lithuanian figure skater
Povilas Varanauskas (born 1941), Lithuanian politician
Povilas Vasiliauskas (born 1953), Lithuanian politician, the president of Klaipeda Association of Industrialists, former mayor of Klaipėda
Povilas Višinskis (1875–1906), Lithuanian writer, journalist, theatre director, and politician
Povilas Žadeikis (1887–1957), representative of Lithuania in the United States from 1934 to 1957

Lithuanian masculine given names
Masculine given names